Turrebaz Khan (died ) was an Indian revolutionary who fought against the British in Hyderabad State during the Indian Rebellion of 1857 and was hung by the British.

Life
Turrebaz Khan was born in Begum Bazar in present-day Hyderabad district. He revolted against the British, despite opposition from the ruling Nizam. A street is named after him in Begum Bazar.

References

Bibliography
 
{{cite web |last1=Daftuar |first1=Swati 

1857 deaths
Indian independence activists from Andhra Pradesh
People from Hyderabad State